Douglas Woodward may refer to:

 Doug Woodward (born 1958), American football quarterback
 John Douglas Woodward (1846–1924), American illustrator
 John Douglas Woodward (athlete) (1925–1995), Canadian Olympic sailor